Dilbar may refer to:

 Delvar, also known as Dilbār, a city in Iran
Dilbar Hussain, Pakistani cricketer
 Dilbar (yacht), launched in 2015
 Al Raya (formerly Dilbar), a yacht launched in 2008
 Dilbar (film), 1994 Bollywood film
 "Dilbar" (song), Bollywood song